Marshall is an unincorporated community in southeastern Dunn County, North Dakota, United States.  It lies along North Dakota Highway 8 east-southeast of the city of Manning, the county seat of Dunn County.  Its elevation is 1,982 feet (604 m).

References

Unincorporated communities in Dunn County, North Dakota
Unincorporated communities in North Dakota